House of 1000 Corpses is the soundtrack album for the movie House of 1000 Corpses, directed by Rob Zombie. It includes artists such as Buck Owens, Helen Kane, The Ramones, Lionel Richie, Slim Whitman, Trina, Scott Humphrey and Zombie himself, along with numerous instrumentals and audio samples taken from the movie.

Track listing
"Howdy Folks" – 0:31
"House of 1000 Corpses" (Rob Zombie) – 3:43
"Saddle Up the Mule" – 0:17
"Everybody Scream" (Theme from Dr. Wolfenstein's Creature Double Feature Show) (Rob Zombie) – 2:36
"Stuck in the Mud" – 1:16
"Holy Miss Moley" – 0:16
"Who's Gonna Mow Your Grass?" (Buck Owens) – 2:19
"Run, Rabbit, Run" (Rob Zombie) – 3:01
"Into the Pit" – 1:21
"Something for You Men" – 0:20
"I Wanna Be Loved by You" (Helen Kane) – 2:47
"Pussy Liquor" (Rob Zombie) – 4:57
"Scarecrow Attack" – 2:12
"My Baby Boy" – 0:14
"Now I Wanna Sniff Some Glue" (The Ramones) – 1:34
"Investigation and the Smokehouse" – 0:35
"Bigger the Cushion" – 2:26
"I Remember You" (Slim Whitman) – 2:03
"Drive Out the Rabbit" – 0:13
"Mary's Escape" – 1:19
"Little Piggy" (Rob Zombie) – 3:54
"Ain't the Only Thing Tasty" – 0:26
"Dr. Satan" – 0:19
"Brick House 2003" (Rob Zombie featuring Lionel Richie and Trina) – 3:48
"To the House" – 2:29

Chart positions
Album - Billboard (North America)

See also
 Rob Zombie discography

References

Albums produced by Rob Zombie
Albums produced by Scott Humphrey
2003 soundtrack albums
Geffen Records soundtracks
Rock soundtracks
Firefly (film series)
Comedy film soundtracks
Horror film soundtracks